Yes, No is the thirteenth studio album by Japanese Jazz fusion band T-Square. It was released on February 26, 1988 through Columbia Records and was the last studio album by the band released under the name The Square.

Background
The first track on this album, Dans Sa Chambre, was used as the theme song for the Japanese talk show Time 3, shown on Fuji Network System. It was also used as the opening theme for news show Businessman News, shown on TV Tokyo. The second track on the album, Go For It was used to advertise for the 1990 Toyota Sera.

Rerelease and live recordings
On November 21, 2001, Village Records rereleased Yes, No on CD and DSD formats.

The album was included in the T-Square 35th Anniversary THE BOX 2013 box set.

Mr. Mellow was performed on the Megalith live album. Miss You was included in the Wordless Anthology V compilation album and performed live on the Megalith, Miss You In New York and T-Square Live (Featuring F-1 Grand Prix Theme) live albums. Crisis and Go For It were included on the F-1 Grand Prix compilation album. Papillon was rearranged and performed on the Miss You In New York live album.

Track listing
Sources

Personnel
Sources 
The Square
Hirotaka Izumi - keyboards, synthesizer and programmable synthesizer
Hiroyuki Noritake - drums
Masahiro Andoh - guitar and programmable synthesizer
Mitsuru Sutoh - bass
Takeshi Itoh - alto saxophone and EWI

Additional Musicians
Tatsuji Yokoyama - percussion (4,5)
Toshihiro Nakanishi Group - strings (1,10)
Charles Loper - trombone (1,2,3,4)
Daniel Higgins - tenor saxophone, flute (1,2,3,4)
Gary Grant - trumpets, flugelhorn (1,2,3,4)
Jerry Hey - trumpets, flugelhorn (1,2,3,4)

References

T-Square (band) albums
1988 albums